B. Arundhathi is a playback singer and Indian classical music vocalist. She has sung many songs in Malayalam, Tamil and Telugu films, predominantly in Malayalam films. The famous Malayalam song "Ethra Pookalam" is sung by her. She is widely popular for her versatility in singing both carnatic music and light music equally well. She is a recipient of the Kerala Sangeetha Nataka Akademi Award in the Light Music category (2009).

Family 
She is married to Mr. T. S. Hariharan, who is a Retired bank officer and has two children. Her elder daughter Charu Hariharan is  mastered in psychology and plays mridangam very well. Charu has band "Varldens Band" based at Sweden along with some International musicians. Charu is also a Playback Singer - "Thotte Thotteduthe" (Venal Maram) 2009, "Sunday Sooriyan" (Ivar Vivahitharayal) 2009, "Mizhiyoram" (Yaakshi Yours faithfully) 2012, "Illimulam" (Iniyum Ethra Dooram) 2016, lyricist - song "My Heart" (Chattakkari) 2012 and music composer - album "Moodi Thirandidum", Songs "Nimishame", "Vinmeghamaay" & "Varmathiye" (Movie - Oru Karibbean Udayippu) 2019. Her younger son Sreekanth Hariharan is a violinist and a Playback Singer  - Songs - "Unakaga" (Movie: Bigil), "Aazhi Soozhnda (Sivappu, Manjal, Pachai), Uthira Uthira (Ponmanickavel), "Neengalum OOrum (Genius), "Pularmanju" (Iniyum Ethra Dooram), "Doore Dooreya" (Neeharika).

Discography (Film)

References

Living people
Indian women playback singers
Malayalam playback singers
Year of birth missing (living people)
Place of birth missing (living people)
20th-century Indian women classical singers
20th-century Indian women singers
20th-century Indian singers
21st-century Indian women singers
21st-century Indian singers
Tamil playback singers
Telugu playback singers
Recipients of the Kerala Sangeetha Nataka Akademi Award